The 1995 DFB-Pokal Final decided the winner of the 1994–95 DFB-Pokal, the 52nd season of Germany's premier knockout football cup competition. It was played on 24 June 1995 at the Olympiastadion in Berlin. Borussia Mönchengladbach won the match 3–0 against VfL Wolfsburg to claim their third cup title.

Route to the final
The DFB-Pokal was a 64 teams in a single-elimination knockout cup competition. There were a total of five rounds leading up to the final. Teams were drawn against each other, and the winner after 90 minutes would advance. If still tied, 30 minutes of extra time was played. If the score was still level, a penalty shoot-out was used to determine the winner.

Note: In all results below, the score of the finalist is given first (H: home; A: away).

Match

Details

References

External links
 Match report at kicker.de 
 Match report at WorldFootball.net
 Match report at Fussballdaten.de 

Borussia Mönchengladbach matches
VfL Wolfsburg matches
1994–95 in German football cups
1995
June 1995 sports events in Europe
1995 in Berlin
Football competitions in Berlin